A cape is a clothing accessory or a sleeveless outer garment which drapes the wearer's back, arms, and chest, and connects at the neck.

History

Capes were common in medieval Europe, especially when combined with a hood in the chaperon. They have had periodic returns to fashion - for example, in nineteenth-century Europe. Catholic clergy wear a type of cape known as a ferraiolo, which is worn for formal events outside a ritualistic context. The cope is a liturgical vestment in the form of a cape. Capes are often highly decorated with elaborate embroidery. Capes remain in regular use as rainwear in various military units and police forces, in France for example. A gas cape was a voluminous military garment designed to give rain protection to someone wearing the bulky gas masks used in twentieth-century wars.

Rich noblemen and elite warriors of the Aztec Empire would wear a tilmàtli; a Mesoamerican cloak/cape used as a symbol of their upper status. Cloth and clothing was of utmost importance to the Aztecs. The more elaborate and colorful tilmàtlis were strictly reserved for elite high priests, emperors; and the Eagle warriors as well as Jaguar warriors.

Semantic distinction

In fashion, the word "cape" usually refers to a shorter garment and "cloak" to a full-length version of the different types of garment, though the two terms are sometimes used synonymously for full-length coverings. A shoulder cape is thus sometimes called a "capelet". The fashion cape does not cover the front to any appreciable degree. In raingear, a cape is usually a long and roomy protective garment worn to keep one dry in the rain.

Use in formal wear
In full evening dress, ladies frequently use the cape as a fashion statement, or to protect the wearer or the fine fabrics of their evening-wear from the elements, especially where a coat would crush—or hide—the garment. These capes may be short (over the shoulders or to the waist) or a full-length cloak. Short capes were usually made of, or trimmed in, fur; however, because fur is less accepted as a fashion accessory in modern times, other expensive materials are substituted for it, with an opulent lining and trim. Typical fabrics used are velvet, silk, and satin. Capes are still authorized as an alternative to the more utilitarian trench coat for U.S. Army officers in mess dress, formal evening uniform.

The caped overcoat variant
Caped overcoats were popular for men during the Victorian era, with some caped Ulsters featuring multiple layered capes, and the Inverness coat (both formal evening and working day variants) had a cape. The Inverness coat is no longer commonly worn (though it has begun to be revived, on a limited scale, in steampunk fashion), and the Ulster lost its cape in the 1920s.

As protection

In modern times, capes are commonly used by hair and beauty salons for the purpose of hair styling services, in which usage they protect clothing from loose strands of hair being cut from the head and/or from the chemicals often used in such styling.

In fiction

The cape is a popular clothing item for superheroes (like Superman) in the American comic book genre. They are often used by comic book artists to create the illusion of motion in a still image. Most often, they are worn merely as a costume adornment. Other times, as in the case of Batman, The Shroud, Cloak of Cloak & Dagger and cloak of Doctor Strange the cape serves a functional purpose, such as gliding (Batman), transporting one to the Darkforce dimension (The Shroud), or initiating teleportation (Cloak). The supernatural character Spawn has a cape (actually a part of his living symbiotic costume) that obeys Spawn's mental commands, changing shape to scare, confuse or even kill would-be attackers, while Meta Knight of the Kirby franchise disguises his wings as a cape. Some media, such as Watchmen or The Incredibles, comment on the potentially lethal hazards of a cape.

See also

 Artois (cloak)
 Cape (dog)
 Cloak
 Tilmàtli
 Tippet
 Duster (clothing)
 Mantle (clothing)
 Wrap (clothing)

Notes

Medieval European costume
Robes and cloaks